Jatun Alfapata or Jatun Allpapata (possibly from Quechua hatun big, allpa earth, pata step, bank of a river, "big earth step" or "big earth bank") is  mountain in the Andes of Peru. It is located in the Cusco Region, Paucartambo Province, Kosñipata District, and in the Quispicanchi Province, in the districts of Marcapata and Ocongate. It lies in the Ayakachi group, the northern extension of the Vilcanota mountain range. Jatun Alfapata is situated northwest of Velacota and east of  Jolljepunco.

References 

Mountains of Peru
Mountains of Cusco Region
Glaciers of Peru